The Happiness Patrol is the second serial of the 25th season of the British science fiction television series Doctor Who, which was first broadcast in three weekly parts on BBC1 from 2 to 16 November 1988.

The serial is set on the Earth colony world Terra Alpha. In the serial, the alien time traveller the Seventh Doctor (Sylvester McCoy) starts a rebellion against the planet's ruler, Helen A (Sheila Hancock), a woman who seeks to eliminate all unhappiness on the planet.

Plot
The Seventh Doctor and Ace visit a human colony on the planet Terra Alpha, where the planet's secret police force, the Happiness Patrol, roam the streets hunting down and killing so-called 'Killjoys'. The colony is governed by Helen A, obsessed with eliminating unhappiness. Also in her employment is the Kandy Man, a grotesque, sweet-based robot created by Gilbert M, one of Helen A's senior advisers.

The Doctor and Ace meet an unhappy guard, Susan Q, who becomes an ally, and Earl Sigma, a wandering harmonica player. They, along with the native inhabitants of Terra Alpha, the Pipe People, work to overthrow the tyranny of Helen A. They begin supporting public demonstrations of unhappiness, encouraging the people to revolt, and attempting to expose Helen A's population control programme to Trevor Sigma, an official galactic census taker.

The first to be disposed of is Helen A’s pet Stigorax, Fifi, a rat-dog creature used to hunt down the Pipe People, as it is crushed in the pipes below the city when Earl causes an avalanche of crystallised sugar with his harmonica. Then they destroy the Kandyman in a flow of his own fondant surprise (previously used to execute dissidents). Realising that she is beaten, Helen A attempts to escape the planet in a rocket, only to discover that the rocket has already been commandeered by Gilbert M and Joseph C, her husband. She tries to flee, but the Doctor stops her, and tries to teach her about the true nature of happiness, which can only be understood if counterbalanced by sadness. Helen A at first sneers at the Doctor, but when she discovers the remains of her beloved pet Fifi, she collapses in tears, and finally feels some sadness of her own.

Production

Working titles for this story included The Crooked Smile. The production team considered transmitting this story in black and white to fit with its intended film noir atmosphere. A fan myth holds that the third episode was supposed to be animated, but this was never the case. The entire serial was shot in studio in July and August 1988.

Helen A was intended to be a caricature of then British Prime Minister Margaret Thatcher. Hancock stated that she "hate[d] Mrs Thatcher with a deep and venomous passion". In 2010, Sylvester McCoy told the Sunday Times: "Our feeling was that Margaret Thatcher was far more terrifying than any monster the Doctor had encountered". The Doctor's calls on the drones to down their tools and revolt was intended as an allusion to the UK miners' strike (1984–1985). Most of this element was eventually toned down.

In the story, the Doctor sings "As Time Goes By", sung by Dooley Wilson in Casablanca. John Normington played Morgus in The Caves of Androzani, and later appeared in "Ghost Machine", an episode of Torchwood. Lesley Dunlop previously played Norna in 1984's Frontios and Harold Innocent would go on to appear in the 1993 radio serial The Paradise of Death.

Broadcast and reception

Bassett's complained over the similarity between the Kandy Man in this story and their trademark character. The BBC agreed not to use the Kandy Man again.

Radio Times reviewer Patrick Mulkern awarded The Happiness Patrol a full five stars and described it as a "clever and funny satire" and praised the acting and political commentary. DVD Talk's John Sinnott gave The Happiness Patrol five out of five stars, calling it a "minor masterpiece". He commended the irony, social commentary, and McCoy's acting. Authors Graeme Burk and Robert Smith included The Happiness Patrol in their 2013 book Who's 50: The 50 Doctor Who Stories to Watch Before You Die. For GamesRadar+ in 2015, Will Salmon included The Happiness Patrol among "The strangest Doctor Who stories", describing it as an "infamous Sylvester McCoy story" that "is actually rather good, but there's no denying its peculiarity [...] There's lots of interesting stuff going on beneath the surface of this story: anti-war speeches, Orwellian oppression and protests against Section 28. There's little doubt that, nearly 30 years later, it's still one of the most iconoclastic Doctor Who stories ever. And one of the oddest."

In his book Doctor Who: A British Alien?, which explores the series' use of science fiction allegory and metaphor, Danny Nicol questioned the serial's claimed anti-Thatcherism agenda, stating, "The part of Helen A was played by Sheila Hancock in a way which served to remind the viewer of Margaret Thatcher, leading to the serial being seen as a satire on the Thatcher governments. Yet Helen A's policies—death squads, executions and the extensive state establishment of sugar factories—bear no relation to Thatcher's, making claims of a Thatcher metaphor less convincing." In The Discontinuity Guide, Paul Cornell, Martin Day and Keith Topping identify a gay subtext to the story: "there's entrapment over cottaging, the TARDIS is painted pink, and the victim of the fondant surprise is every inch the proud gay man, wearing, as he does, a pink triangle." The story ends with Helen A's husband abandoning her and leaving with another man.

Rowan Williams, Archbishop of Canterbury, referred to this story in his 2011 Easter sermon, on the subject of happiness and joy. Marc Sidwell has described it as an expression of national unease at rave culture.

Commercial releases

In print

A novelisation of this serial, written by scriptwriter Graeme Curry, was published by Target Books in February 1990. Adapting his scripts rather than the televised version, Curry's book includes scenes cut during editing and his original envisioning of the Kandy Man with a human appearance, albeit with powdery white skin and edible candy-cane glasses. An unabridged reading of the novelisation by Rula Lenska was released by BBC Audiobooks in July 2009.

Home media
The Happiness Patrol was released on VHS on 4 August 1997, by BBC Worldwide. It was then released on DVD on 7 May 2012 alongside Dragonfire as part of the "Ace Adventures" box set. This serial was also released as part of the Doctor Who DVD Files in Issue 119 on 24 July 2013.

References

External links

Script to Screen: The Happiness Patrol, by Jon Preddle (Time Space Visualiser issue 42, January 1995)

Target novelisation

Seventh Doctor serials
1988 British television episodes